SLAM family member 6 is a protein that in humans is encoded by the SLAMF6 gene.

The protein encoded by this gene is a type I transmembrane protein, belonging to the CD2 subfamily of the immunoglobulin superfamily. This encoded protein is expressed on natural killer (NK), T, and B lymphocytes. It undergoes tyrosine phosphorylation and associates with the Src homology 2 domain-containing protein (SH2D1A) as well as with SH2 domain-containing phosphatases (SHPs). It may function as a coreceptor in the process of NK cell activation. It can also mediate inhibitory signals in NK cells from X-linked lymphoproliferative patients.

References

Further reading